Nicholas Francis (French: Nicolas François de Lorraine; 6 December 1609 – 25 January 1670), also known as Nicholas II, was briefly Duke of Lorraine and Duke of Bar for a few months in 1634, spanning the time between the abdication of his older brother and his own resignation. He was therefore Duke during the invasion of Lorraine by the French in the Thirty Years War.

He is the direct male ancestor of all rulers of the Habsburg-Lorraine dynasty, including all Emperors of Austria.

Biography

Nicholas Francis was the youngest son of Duke Francis II of Lorraine and his wife, Christina of Salm.  Born on the feast of Saint Nicholas, he was named in his honour. His sister was Marguerite of Lorraine, the Duchess of Orléans and wife of Gaston, Duke of Orléans.

As it appeared unlikely that he would succeed to the duchy, he was destined for the church.  He was made coadjutor bishop of Toul, in spite of his youth, in 1619 and succeeded to the see in 1624, but never actually received any sacred orders. He studied philosophy and theology at the University of Pont-à-Mousson, 1622–1629. He returned to Nancy in June 1629. The thesis he prepared on the sacrament of penance was printed in Holland in 1627 with a dedication to Pope Urban VIII. After his promotion to the cardinalate, he received private lessons from two Jesuit priests.

Nicholas Francis was named abbot in commendam – a lucrative sinecure – of several abbeys and was sent on several embassies by his brother, Charles IV, Duke of Lorraine, and by Louis XIII of France.

On 19 January 1626 he was created cardinal in pectore (secretly). The appointment was not proclaimed publicly until 30 August 1627. He never received the cardinal's red hat nor was he assigned a cardinal-deaconry. When in 1634 his brother Charles was pressured into resigning in his favor, he became sovereign Duke of Lorraine. He wrote to Pope Urban VIII, 4 March 1634, resigning as cardinal to marry his cousin Claude of Lorraine, the second daughter of Henry II, on 17–18 February. On 8 March 1634, the pope declared him in nullo e sacris ordinis constitutum, depriving him of the title of cardinal and the diocese of Toul. In the consistory of 22 March 1634, the pope communicated this to the College of Cardinals.

Immediately following Nicholas's accession to the dukedom, the French invaded the duchy and forced the new duke to sign a treaty recognizing their right to occupy it.  In April 1634, Nicholas himself fled into exile, and soon after abdicated himself, returning the claim to the duchy to his older brother, Charles.  With one brief exception, Charles would not, however, be able to return to his duchy until 1661.

Ancestry

Family and issue

He married his first cousin Claude Françoise de Lorraine who died in childbirth:

 Ferdinand Philippe, Hereditary Prince of Lorraine, jure matris Duke of Bar (29 December 1639 – 1 April 1659)
 Charles Léopold, Duke of Lorraine (3 April 1643 – 18 April 1690); married Eleonora Maria of Austria and had issue.
 Anne Eléanore of Lorraine (12 May 1645 – 28 February 1646); died in infancy, buried in the Ducal Crypt, Vienna.
 Anne Marie Thérèse of Lorraine (30 July 1648 – 17 June 1661); Abbess of Remiremont, no issue.
 Marie Anne of Lorraine (born 30 Jul 1648, date of death unknown).

See also

 Dukes of Bar

External links
The Cardinals of the Holy Roman Church:

1609 births
1670 deaths
Nicholas Francis
Nicholas Francis
Bishops of Toul
17th-century French cardinals
Cardinals created by Pope Urban VIII
Nicholas Francis
Nicholas Francis
Deposed cardinals